1962 Academy Awards may refer to:

 34th Academy Awards, the Academy Awards ceremony that took place in 1962
 35th Academy Awards, the 1963 ceremony honoring the best in film for 1962